Classic Albums Live is a concert series based in Toronto, Ontario, in which musicians perform a classic rock album in its entirety.  The series was founded in 2003 by Craig Martin, a musician who had previously produced a series of boutique cabaret shows as well as composed music for television and film.

The musicians go to great lengths to faithfully recreate every sound on the original album. They have performed with orchestras, sitarists, choirs and schools. The shows are treated like recitals with the album being performed in its entirety followed by a 'greatest hits' set of the featured artist.

In recent years, the series has presented concerts in a variety of cities, including Orlando, Florida, Los Angeles, Philadelphia, Akron, La Mirada, Jacksonville, Gainesville, Lakeland, Coral Springs, New York, New Jersey, Dallas, Houston, Uncasville, Connecticut, Las Vegas, Nevada, and Rochester, New York. On December 17, 2006, Classic Albums Live performed the entire 213-song Beatles song catalogue in one 13-hour concert at the Phoenix Concert Theatre in Toronto.

A different lineup performs each album. There is a group of core musicians who are frequently part of the performances, including Nick Hildyard, Rob Phillips, Lindsay Clark, Leslea Keurvorst, Troy Feener, Clifton David, Dom Polito, Doug Inglis and Marty Morin. Occasionally, more famous Canadian musicians are brought in as well, including Mia Sheard, Kim Bingham, Nicholas Walsh, and ex-members of Moist. In some venues, they will bring in local musicians to fill needed spots. For example, on June 16, 2006, the group performed the Beatles' Sgt. Pepper album at the Hard Rock Live in Orlando; they brought in the Orlando Philharmonic Orchestra to fill in on the orchestral parts.

When performing in Toronto, they usually play at Massey Hall.  The producer of Classic Albums Live has created a musical called Gig which will run in 2016.

List of albums performed:

The Beatles' catalogue
Led Zeppelin
Led Zeppelin II
Led Zeppelin IV
Houses of the Holy
Physical Graffiti
In Through the Out Door
Meddle
The Dark Side of the Moon
Animals
Wish You Were Here
The Wall
A Night at the Opera
Who's Next
Are You Experienced
Boston
Crime of the Century
Breakfast in America
The Last Waltz
Rust Never Sleeps
Harvest
The Rise and Fall of Ziggy Stardust and the Spiders from Mars
OK Computer
Ten
Nevermind
Regatta de Blanc
Outlandos d'Amour
The Joshua Tree
London Calling
Band on the Run
Texas Flood
Let It Bleed
Sticky Fingers
Some Girls
Exile on Main St.
Appetite for Destruction
Highway to Hell
Back in Black
Born to Run
Hotel California
Rumours
The Doors
L.A. Woman
Legend
Pearl
Paranoid
Van Halen
Thriller
Purple Rain
Nothing's Shocking
Woodstock
2112
Saturday Night Fever
A Very Lennon Christmas
Elton John Greatest Hits
Damn the Torpedoes
Graceland

References

External links
Classic Albums Live
 
 
http://newburyportarts.blogspot.com/2011/06/classic-albums-live-in-salisbury.html
http://www.torontosun.com/entertainment/music/2011/04/14/17996836.html?sms_ss=facebook&at_xt=4da90553bfe53d42%2C0
 http://www.torontosun.com/entertainment/music/2011/04/14/17996836.html?sms_ss=facebook&at_xt=4da90553bfe53d42%2C0
 https://web.archive.org/web/20150923194357/http://www.brantfordexpositor.ca/2014/01/22/its-only-rock-n-roll
 https://www.thestar.com/entertainment/music/2010/10/27/ghosts_of_dead_rockers_haunt_toronto_concert_halls.html
 https://lfpress.com/entertainment/music/2010/10/22/15795716.html
 http://legacy.pitchengine.com/irvinebarclaytheatre/the-beatles-abbey-road---live-in-irvine
 http://www.1053rock.ca/audio/nick-walsh-classic-albums-live/
 http://beintheloopchicago.com/classic-albums-live-david-bowie-rise-fall-ziggy-stardust-live-ravinia-2016/
 https://www.lambtonshield.com/concert-review-classic-albums-live-the-beatles-sgt-peppers-lonely-hearts-club-band/
 https://www.thestar.com/entertainment/stage/2016/08/12/toronto-celebrates-50th-anniversary-of-beatles-concert-with-another-concert.html
 https://www.barrietoday.com/local-news/fleetwood-macs-rumours-to-be-recreated-by-hard-working-musicians-443107

 http://www.timesheraldonline.com/article/ZZ/20141120/NEWS/141129948
 http://legacy.pitchengine.com/irvinebarclaytheatre/the-beatles-abbey-road---live-in-irvine
 http://kawarthanow.com/2016/08/12/musicfest-2016-classic-albums-live/
 http://www.theledger.com/news/20170706/what-drives-people-to-see-shows-at-rp-funding-center
 https://www.thestar.com/entertainment/music/2013/11/22/classic_rock_albums_relived_on_stage.html
 http://www.theledger.com/news/20160713/classic-albums-live-to-perform-the-allman-brothers-greatest-hits
 http://www.ourlondon.ca/whatson-story/6999175-classic-albums-brings-lizard-king-to-london/
 https://web.archive.org/web/20161227060417/http://www.montereyherald.com/article/NF/20160216/FEATURES/160219787
 http://www.chicagotribune.com/suburbs/daily-southtown/lifestyles/ct-sta-classic-albums-live-st-0529-20150526-story.html
 http://www.fyimusicnews.ca/articles/2016/02/19/classic-albums-live-canadian-success-story
 https://calgaryherald.com/entertainment/music/classic-albums-live-to-play-note-for-note-version-of-abbey-road
 https://beaus.ca/event/beaus-shows-classic-albums-live-ccr-chronicle-2/
 http://www.niagarafallsreview.ca/2015/12/02/classic-albums-live-bring-the-riffs-to-new-home

Musical groups established in 2003
Musical groups from Toronto
Canadian rock music groups
2003 establishments in Ontario